Pietro Borradori (Milan, 1965) is an Italian composer and pianist.

Biography
He began to play Piano at the age of 8 years-old. At 12, he started to compose his first short pieces for piano. He then studied Piano with Carlo Pestalozza in Milan, graduated in Musical Composition at the Conservatory of Milan with Giacomo Manzoni, and at Accademia Chigiana of Siena with Franco Donatoni. He subsequently studied in Freiburg with Emmanuel Nunes and in Paris with Gerard Grisey. In addition to his musical formation he studied Architecture at the Politecnico of Milan. From 1987 to 1992 he taught Composition at the Conservatory of Music of Trento.
His pieces has been performed by the main European Ensembles and Orchestras. He received among others commissions from institutions like Radio France, French Ministere of Culture, West Deutscher Rundfunk, Radio Televisione Italiana, Nederlands Radio Symphonic Orchestra, Festival Milano Musica, Fondazione Roma Europa,  Gulbenkian Foundation.
He recorded monographic CDs for Fonit Cetra and BMG Ricordi labels. The works from 1987 to 1994 has been published by BMG Ricordi.

Besides his activity as a composer, he acted as music promoter and artistic director as well as entrepreneur in the information technology field.
In 1989 he founded together with Riccardo Nova and Andreas Dohmen the Nuove Sincronie Festival of Contemporary Music; he was in charge of the artistic direction of that Festival for all the ten seasons of its life. He founded at the same time the Ensemble Nuove Sincronie, an Instrumental Ensemble dedicated to the new music repertoire.

In 1995 he founded Allegroassai, a Software House dedicated to the development of a new Music Notation Technology called Vivaldi, and the online Interactive Sheet Music Library project Vivaldistudio and in 2008 SimilarPages. a Specialized Search Engine designed to easily find similar and alternatives websites.

Since 2015 his interest has shifted towards the neoclassical field, minimalism and electronic music.

Discography
 1990 - Camera Obscura (Italy, Fonit Cetra)
 1994 - Opus Incertum (Italy, BMG Ricordi)
 1993 - Nuove Sincronie 92 (Italy, Sincronie)
 1993 - Contemporanea Koine (Italy, Stile Libero)

Works 
 1985 - Epilogo, for Piano
 1986 - Textualist textures I, for Trio
 1986 - Textualist textures II, for Quintet
 1987 - Dialogues entre Metopes, for Ensemble
 1987 - Epigram for Morton Feldman, for Flute
 1987 - Fragmenta Veneris, for Ensemble
 1988 - Holzwege, for Ensemble
 1989 - Camera Obscura, for Piano Quartett
 1990 - Streichquartett N.1, for String Quartett
 1990 - Zwei Orgelstucke, for Organ
 1990 - Puer Senex, for Orchestra
 1991 - Dialectical Landscapes, for Cello and Piano
 1991 - Pan, for Orchestra
 1992 - Opus Incertum, for Ensemble
 1992 - Opus Quadratum, for Octet
 1992 - Opus Alexandrinum, for Cello and Ensemble
 1992 - Cantata Puer Aeternus, for Choir, Soloists, and Chamber Orchestra
 1993 - Trame perdute, for 2 Pianos
 1993 - Dialectical Landscapes III, for Trio
 1993 - Obliquo, for Marimba
 1993 - Family Dancing, for Viola
 1994 - In Medias Res, for Large Ensemble 
 1994 - Opus Ligneum, for Ensemble 
 1994 - Drei Blicke in einem Opal I, for Piano and Ensemble
 1994 - Trame perdute II, for Piano
 1996 - Drei Blicke in einem Opal II, for Piano and Ensemble
 1997 - Fabulae, for Horn and String Orchestra
 1997 - Persistency of the objects I, for Ensemble
 1998 - Persistency  of the objects II, for Ensemble
 1998 - Pan II, for Ensemble
 2005 - Project B, for Electronics
 2011 - Pan II remixed, for Electronics
 2014 - Etude pour piano, for Piano
 2015 - Deux etudes pour piano, for Piano
 2016 - Rem, for 2 Amplified Pianos & Electronics
 2017 - Skew Lines #1, for solo piano
 2020 - Dual, for 2 Pianos and 2 Cellos

Main Prizes 
 1988 - 2nd Prize, RAI Radio Televisione Italiana 'Malipiero', Italy
 1988 - 1st Prize, Kucyna Priza - ALEA III, United States
 1989 - Finalist, Gaudeamus International Competition, Nederlands
 1989 - 1st Prize, Forum Junger Komponist WDR, Germany
 1990 - Finalist, Olympia Prize, Greece
 1990 - Finalist, Gaudeamus International Competition, Nederlands
 1991 - 1st Prize, Ensemblia International Competition WDR, Germany
 1994 - 2nd Prize, Honour Mention Gaudeamus International Competition, Nederlands
In 1993 his Streichquartett N.1 has been selected from RAI Italian Radio Television, to represent Italy to the International Tribune of Contemporary Music 1993.

External sources
 Pietro Borradori - Official Website
 Official Instagram Artist Page
 Spotify Artist Page
 VivaldiStudio - Music Notation Software
 SimilarPages.com  - Easily Find Similar and Alternatives Websites

References 

1965 births
Living people
Italian classical composers
Italian male classical composers
Accademia Musicale Chigiana alumni
Milan Conservatory alumni
20th-century classical composers
20th-century Italian composers
20th-century Italian male musicians